Miralda scopulorum is a species of sea snail, a marine gastropod mollusc in the family Pyramidellidae, the pyrams and their allies.

Description
The shell grows to a length of 2 mm.

Distribution
This species occurs in the Pacific Ocean off the Philippines and Hawaii.

References

External links
 To World Register of Marine Species
 Sea Slugs of Hawaii : Miralda scopulorum

Pyramidellidae
Gastropods described in 1886